Soegaon or Soyagav is a town and a Taluka in Aurangabad district in the state of Maharashtra, India. It is the headquarter of Soegaon Taluka and located in base of Ajanta hills on Aurangabad- Jalgaon Highway in western India. The city is about 120 km from Aurangabad and 60 km from Jalgaon. It is a fast developing city in Aurangabad which has many historical places and scenery like Ajanta Caves, Ghatotkach fort, Vadi fort, Vetalvadi dam, etc.

History
Nizam's own estate called “Sarf-e-Khas” comprising two talukas was merged with the
Government area under Sarf-e-Khas (Merger) Regulation of 1949.
Consequent upon the integration of Jagirs and Sarf-e-Khas areas, all the
taluka boundaries were reconstituted in April 1950. Two new Mahals
(Tahsils) with headquarters at Jafferabad were created. In 1953 another new
mahal (tahsil) with headquarters at Soegaon was created by transferring 37
villages from Sillod taluka and 30 from Kannad taluka. All the villages
transferred to this mahal are situated to the north of the Satmala hills. With
the reorganisation of States in 1956, the district was transferred from
Hyderabad State to Bombay State and since 1960 it forms a part of
Maharashtra.

Geography and tourism
Soegaon is lies near the source of Sona river. Soegaon is situated in the northern part of Aurangabad district. City is located on the border of Jalgaon Aurangabad district.

The Ajanta caves are situated in this taluka, near the village of Fardapur. It is approximately 10 km from this village.

Near this city historical fort called as Ghatotkach and Vadi fort are located.

The Banoti waterfall is located nearby, as is the Gautala Wildlife Sanctuary.

Religion

References

2018 Census

Cities and towns in Aurangabad district, Maharashtra
Talukas in Maharashtra